Kumkum – Ek Pyara Sa Bandhan (A lovely bond) is an Indian television series that aired on Star Plus from 15 July 2002 to 13 March 2009 in the afternoon slot. Hussain Kuwajerwala and Juhi Parmar played the lead roles Sumeet and Kumkum. It was produced under the company BAG films. The show is currently being reaired on Star Plus and Utsav Plus at 2:30 pm.

Plot

The soap opera tells the tale of the Wadhwa family and its daughter-in-law, Kumkum. She is happily married to Jatin. However, he dies of a brain tumor while she is expecting their first child. The Wadhwas decide to get their young daughter-in-law remarried and find an eligible young man named Vishal. However, when obstacles arise leading and the marriage is called off on the last day, Jatin's younger brother Sumeet impulsively marries Kumkum in order to save her from societal disgrace. Sumeet is plagued by guilt for marrying Kumkum against her will, but she eventually falls in deep love with him while trying to expose Renuka (Sumeet's ex-girlfriend). The crux of the story evolves as a blossoming romance between Sumeet and Kumkum leads them to realise that they are soulmates and how Kumkum being the ideal daughter-in-law of the Wadhwa family protects Sumeet's family despite the adverse circumstances facing them. Manik (an impostor bearing Jatin's face) creates havoc in their lives, but Kumkum exposes his fake identity and unites with Sumeet. Kumkum gives birth to Sharman and Aashka (Sumeet and Kumkum's progeny).

20 Years Later

Sumeet and Kumkum's story continues with their grown-up kids Dhruv, Sharman and Aashka and Kumkum's role of establishing harmony in the Wadhwa family. Dhruv's wife Antara plans an elaborate ruse to usurp the Wadhwa property and house to herself, but her plans are foiled after Sumeet and Kumkum unveil her truth to Dhruv. Sharman who is in deep love with Neeti gets engaged to her, but when Dhruv refuses to accept Siya on the day of the wedding owing to his feelings for Antara, Sharman impulsively marries Siya. Siya is disappointed and vents her frustration at the Wadhwa family, but she eventually forgives Sharman and confesses her love for him and Sumeet-Kumkum are finally happy to see the Wadhwa family happily settled. Unfortunately both Kumkum and Sumeet die before they complete a ritual that would enable them to be soulmates by Pulkit (Kumkum's ex-stalker) who conspires to kill Sumeet after trailing Kumkum secretly for several days. The shot misses Sumeet, but Kumkum is shot dead and Sumeet punishes Pulkit but still kills himself, unable to bear the separation.

20 Years Later, Sumeet & Kumkum are Reincarnated

Sumeet and Kumkum are reborn as prophesied again without any memory of their past life. In the new life Sumeet and Kumkum initially hate each other, but fall in deep love all over again owing to unusual circumstances, prompting them to be a false husband and wife in front of their family members. When they finally realise their love for each other, they are separated due to a misunderstanding between the Raichand and Mishra families and later by a series of new obstacles but eventually reunite in the end. Sumeet marries Kumkum and Harshvardhan and Rajeshwari Wadhwa accompany them to the sacred pilgrimage site where their lives ended in the previous birth. The show ends with memories of the idealistic couple who demonstrated that love finds a way back and is undying and immortal. Sumeet and Kumkum complete the sacred ritual at this place, finally uniting together forever.

Cast

Main
 Juhi Parmar as 
 Kumkum Rai / Kumkum Jatin Wadhwa / Kumkum Sumeet Wadhwa (2002–2008) (Dead)
 Chanda (2003–2004) (Dead)
 Kumkum Mishra / Kumkum Sumeet Raichand (2008–2009)
 Hussain Kuwajerwala as 
 Sumeet Wadhwa (2002–2008) (Dead)
 Sumeet Raichand (2008–2009)

Recurring
 Arun Bali as Harshvardhan Wadhwa (2002–2009)
 Jyotsna Karyekar / Rita Bhaduri as Rajeshwari Harshvardhan Wadhwa (2002) / (2002–2009)
 Paritosh Sand as Kulbhushan Wadhwa (2002–2008)
 Prabha Sinha as Veena Kulbhushan Wadhwa (2002–2009)
 Vivan Bhatena / Vishal Watwani as Dhruv Wadhwa (2006–2007) / (2007–2008)
 Sayantani Ghosh / Sonia Singh as Advocate Antara Dhruv Wadhwa (2006) / (2006–2008) (Dead)
 Karishma Mehta / Nikita Thukral / Snigdha Srivastav as Siya Garewal / Siya Sharman Wadhwa (2006) / (2007) / (2007–2008)
 Gaurav Khanna / Amit Khanna / Gagan Malik as Sharman Wadhwa (2006–2007) / (2007) / (2007–2008)
 Megha Gupta / Ira Soni as Neeti Damani (2006–2007) / (2007–2008)
 Chahat Khanna  / Niyati Joshi as Aashka Wadhwa / Aashka Vikram Kapoor (2006) / (2006–2007)
 Prabhat Bhattacharya / Harsh Vashisht as Rahul Wadhwa (2002–2003) / (2003–2005; 2007–2008)
 Shishir Sharma as Brijbhushan Wadhwa (2002–2006; 2007)
 Alka Kaushal as Sukanya Wadhwa / Sukanya Hemant Malhotra (2002–2008)
 Iqlaq Khan as Hemant Malhotra, Sukanya's husband (2002)
 Mukul Dev as Pulkit (2008) (Dead)
 Soni Singh as Kajal, Pulkit's adopted daughter (2008) (Dead)
 Mihir Mishra as Dr. Vikram Kapoor (2006–2007)
 Shweta Kawatra as Nivedita Mittal (2007)
 Buddhaditya Mohanty as Akshay Saluja (2003)
 Tasneem Sheikh as Renuka Bajaj (2002–2004; 2005) (Dead)
 Abhimanyu Singh / Raman Trikha as Vishal Malhotra (2002) / (2002–2003)
 Anuj Saxena as 
 Jatin Wadhwa (2002) (Dead)
 Manik (2005–2006) (Dead)
  Aman Verma as Abhay Chauhan (2004–2005)
 Kabir Sadanand as Salil Patel (2005) (Dead)
 Sameer Soni as Advocate Yash Thakur (2005)
 Unknown as Gauri Thakur, Yash's daughter (2005)
 Kuljeet Randhawa / Eva Grover as Simran (Simi) Rai, Kumkum's sister (2002) / (2002–2003)
 Kunal Kumar / Vijay Bhatia / Unknown as Uday, Abhay's assistant (2004) / (2004) / (2005)
 Smita Malhotra as Preeti Wadhwa / Preeti Ashutosh Khanna (2002–2005)
 Aparna Bhatnagar as Aarti Wadhwa (2002–2003)
 Unknown / Bhuvan Chopra / Kuldeep Dubey as Dr. Ashutosh Khanna, Preeti's husband (2002) / (2003) / (2005)
 Unknown / Natasha Singh / Malini Kapoor as Malini (Malli) Malhotra / Malini Inder Kashyap (2002–2003) / (2003) / (2003–2004) / (2004–2006)
 Pragati Mehra as Ramola Raichand (2008)
 Hasan Zaidi as Ratan Raichand (2008)
 Aditi Shirwaikar  as Mini Mishra (2008–2009)
 Surendra Pal as Chandumal Mishra (2008–2009)
 Mohini Sharma as Omprakash Raichand's mother (2008)
 Priya Ahuja as Pamela Wadhwa (2007–2008)
 Unknown as Pooja Wadhwa (2007–2008)
 Sanjay Swaraj / Hemant Choudhary as Inspector Bhupendra Singh (2003) / (2003–2004; 2006–2007)
 Yusuf Hussain / Jitendra Trehan as Balwant Rai (Kumkum's father) (2002) / (2002–2003)
 Rajeev Kumar as Raj (2002)
 Radhakrishna Dutta as Mr. Bajaj (2002–2003)
 Imran Khan as 
 Professor Naren (2002)
 Rajeev Oberoi (2007–2008) (Dead)
 Akhil Mishra as Vrinda's Mama (2004)
 Puneet Vashisht as Veerendra (Veeru) Sachdev (2003–2004)
 Kavita Kaushik as Naina Kulkarni / Naina Rahul Wadhwa (2004–2005)
 Rajesh Kumar as Sushant, Naina's ex-husband (2004)
 Ami Trivedi as Vrinda (2004–2005)
 Abir Goswami as Asit Sengupta (2004; 2005) (Dead)
 Surbhi Tiwari as Abha Chauhan (2005)
 Unknown / Tarana Raja as Nalini (Nalli) Malhotra (2002–2003) / (2005) (Dead)
 Gautam Chaturvedi as Akash Patel (2005) (Dead)
 Rushad Rana as Dr. Rohit Kapoor (2005)
 Shagufta Ali as Gul (2005)
 Pankit Thakker as Krishnakant (Krish) Wadhwa (2005–2006)
 Dimple Inamdar as Kamya Verma (2006) (Dead)
 Anang Desai as Advocate Ashwin Vanjara (2006)
 Nimai Bali as Inspector Satyadev Tipley (2007)
 Phalguni Parekh as Susheela, Neeti's Aunt (2006–2007)
 Rohit Bakshi as Sanjay (2007)
 Sonia Kapoor as Inspector Revati (2007–2008)
 Akshita Garud as Child Roshni Mehra (2003–2005)
 Aashish Kaul as Shatru Mishra (2008)
 Varun Shukla as Child Sumeet Raichand (2008)
 Richa Mukherjee as Child Kumkum Mishra (2008)
 Hemant Thatte as Ashwin (2008)
 Faisal Raza Khan as Sarjan Singh (2008–2009)
 Ajay Chaudhary as Ustad (2008–2009)
 Gauri Pradhan Tejwani as Aditi Kapoor (2009)
 Rajesh Khattar as Kishan Katara (2007)
 Hiten Tejwani as Ranveer Singh (2009)
 Jayant Rawal as Basheshwar Kapoor (2009)
 Prithvi Zutshi as Pakiya (2005–2006)
 Roma Bali as Preeto Kapoor (2009)
 Sai Ballal as Mr. Mittal, Nivedita's father (2007) (Dead)
 Meghna Malik as Sushma Akash Patel (2005)
 Kapil Soni as Sanket Patel (2005)
 Nupur Joshi as Mishri (2007)
 Sachin Verma as Mahesh (2007)
 Vineeta Malik as Dulari, Mahesh's grandmother (2007)
 Meenakshi Verma as Mrs. Chauhan (2004)
 Pratichi Mishra as 
 Mrs. Khanna (2002)
 Bhanumati (Manno) Chandumal Mishra (2008–2009)
 Mahru Sheikh as Rukmini Vikram Malhotra (2002–2003)
 Mehul Buch as Vikram Malhotra, Vishal's father (2003)
 Indraneel Bhattacharya as Omprakash Raichand (2008–2009)
 Utkarsha Naik as Yashodhara Omprakash Raichand (2008–2009)
 Jaya Bhattacharya as Devyani (2008)
 Pratap Sachdev as Mr. Verma (2003)
 Simple Kaul as Dr. Chanchal (2008)
 Gurmeet Choudhary as Ballu (2004)
 Iqbal Azad / Siraj Mustafa Khan as Aditya Garewal (2006–2007) / (2007)
 Dinesh Kaushik as Mr. Acharya (2007)
 Manasvi Vyas as Sudha Acharya (2007)
 Manasi Jain as Chutki Acharya (2007)
 Purbi Joshi as Amandeep (2007) (Dead)
 Yash Mittal as Child Nimbuda (2007)
 Sanjeet Bedi as Mohit, Neeti's ex-fiancé (2006–2007)
 Ajit Mehra as Dr. Karan Roy (2002; 2005)
 Vikram Sahu as Dr. Shah (2002; 2005)
 Raja Kapse as Ashok Mehta / Doctor / Dr. Sinha / Mr. Gupta / Kumkum Sumeet Wadhwa's Fake Father 
 Neha Bam as Doctor (2003)
 Nilofer Khan as Madhu Rastogi, Rahul's girlfriend (2003) (Dead)
 Bharat Arora as Rajat Talukdar (2003)
 Vishal Saini as Teju (2004) (Dead)
 Seema Pandey / Shivani Gosain as Komal Raichand (2008) / (2008–2009)
 Avantika Salian as Dilasa Shatru Mishra (2008)
 Monaz Mevawala as Pinky Rai (2004)
 Ahmed Khan as Dhanpat Rai (2004)
 Aadesh Chaudhary as Avinash (2008–2009)
 Manini Mishra as Anita (2004)
 Raj Arjun as Jagannath (2004)
 Dinesh Thakkar as Manohar Shah (2004–2005)
 Sunil Nagar as Mr. Garewal (2004)
 Bhumika Seth as Chandni (2004)
 Sulabha Deshpande / Usha Nadkarni as Viju (2004) / (2004)
 Ali Khan as Madan (2008–2009) 
 Nasir Sheikh as Inspector Sharma (2002)
 Rajesh Dubey as Hotel Manager / Inspector Rajesh Rathore
 Pramatesh Mehta as College Vice Chancellor (2002)
 Rajan Kapoor as Doctor / Tina's Father 
 Deepak Advani as Advocate Goel (2006)
 Sanatan Modi as Advocate (2003)
 Kuldeep Sareen as Murad Khan (2004)
 Imran Hasnee as Naina's Boss (2004)
 Badrul Islam as Chamanlal (2009)
 Unknown  / Unknown as Tara Verma / Tara Rahul Wadhwa (2003) / (2003)
 Shravani Goswami (2004)
 Mithilesh Chaturvedi (2004)
 Shweta Shinde

Production
After 780 episodes, on 10 April 2006, the storyline of the series took a leap of 20 years. Then it took another leap of 20 years in 2008 where the leads were shown reincarnated with a new family.

In February 2009, the channel informed the production house to terminate the series by 13 March 2009. As per the channel's instructions the series ended on that day.

Reception
It received the highest ratings in the afternoon slot and is regarded as one of the longest ran Indian soap during afternoons.

After a time change from 3:30 pm to 1:00pm (IST) in November 2002, it started receiving ratings ranging 6 to 7 TVR in March 2003, becoming the most viewed afternoon show, overcoming the other highest rated afternoon shows like Bhabhi and Shagun. On 25 March 2004, it received the highest ever afternoon rating of 13.12 TVR, overtaking some prime time soaps.

It started to re-air in edit version from 2:30 pm to 3:30 pm.

Accolades 
Indian Telly Awards 2005: Best Actor critic (Female) – Juhi Parmar - Won
Indian Telly Awards 2007: Style Icon of the Year:Hussain Kuwajerwala - Won
Indian Telly Awards 2007: Best Actor in a Leading Role (Male)-Hussain Kuwajerwala- Nominated

References

External links
 Kumkum: Ek Pyara Sa Bandhan Streaming On Hotstar

Indian television soap operas
2002 Indian television series debuts
StarPlus original programming
2009 Indian television series endings